The Copa 2013 MX Apertura was the 70th staging of the Copa MX, the 43rd staging in the professional era and is the third tournament played since the 1996–97 edition.

This tournament started on July 23, 2013 and will conclude on November 5, 2013.
 The winner will face the winner of the Clausura 2014 edition in a playoff to qualify as Mexico 3 to the 2015 Copa Libertadores.

Morelia won their first title after defeating Atlas 3–1 on penalty kicks.

Participants Apertura 2013

This tournament will feature all the clubs from the Liga MX, excluding those that will participate in the 2013-14 CONCACAF Champions League (Tijuana, Toluca, América and Cruz Azul), and all the teams from the Ascenso MX, excluding the team promoted from Segunda División (Ballenas Galeana).

Tiebreakers

If two or more clubs are equal on points on completion of the group matches, the following criteria are applied to determine the rankings:

 superior goal difference;
 higher number of goals scored;
 scores of the group matches played among the clubs in question;
 higher number of goals scored away in the group matches played among the clubs in question;
 best position in the Relegation table;
 fair play ranking;
 drawing of lots.

Group stage

Every group is composed by four clubs, two from Liga MX and two from Ascenso MX. Instead of a traditional robin-round schedule, the clubs will play in three two-legged "rounds", the last one being contested by clubs of the same league.

Each win gives a club 3 points, each draw gives 1 point. An extra point is awarded for every round won; a round is won by aggregated score, and if it is a tie, the extra point will be awarded to the team with higher number of goals scored away.

All times are UTC-05:00

Group 1

Altamira won the round 4–2 on aggregate

Monterrey won the round 5–2 on aggregate

UAT won the round 4–3 on aggregate

Monterrey won the round 4–1 on aggregate

Monterrey won the round 2–1 on aggregate

UAT won the round 2–1 on aggregate

Group 2

Santos Laguna won the round 6–3 on aggregate

Cruz Azul Hidalgo won the round 1–0 on aggregate

Cruz Azul Hidalgo and Santos Laguna drew 0–0 on aggregate and both tied on away goals, thus neither team received the extra point

UANL won the round 4−1 on aggregate

Cruz Azul Hidalgo won on away goals

UANL won the round 5−3 on aggregate

Group 3

Atlante and Mérida drew 3–3 on aggregate and both tied on away goals, thus neither team received the extra point

Chiapas won the round 1–0 on aggregate

Delfines won the round 3–2 on aggregate

Mérida won the round 2–1 on aggregate

Mérida won the round 5–4 on aggregate

Chiapas won the round 4–2 on aggregate

Group 4

Pachuca won the round 1–0 on aggregate

Oaxaca won the round 1–0 on aggregate

Veracruz won the round 5–3 on aggregate

Oaxaca won the round 4–3 on aggregate

Oaxaca won the round 6–1 on aggregate

Pachuca won the round 5–4 on aggregate

Group 5

Querétaro won the round 3–0 on aggregate

U. de G. won the round on away goals

Querétaro won the round 2–0 on aggregate

UNAM won the round 8–1 on aggregate

U. de G. won the round 3–2 on aggregate

UNAM won the round 3–0 on aggregate

Group 6

Guadalajara won the round 2–1 on aggregate

León won the round 3–0 on aggregate

León won the round 2–0 on aggregate

Guadalajara won the round 5–3 on aggregate

Sinaloa won the round 3–0 on aggregate

Guadalajara and León drew 1–1 on aggregate and both tied on away goals, thus neither team received the extra point

Group 7

Morelia won the round 4−0 on aggregate

Atlas won the round 4−3 on aggregate

Morelia won the round 7−0 on aggregate

Atlas won the round 4−2 on aggregate

Estudiantes Tecos won the round 6−2 on aggregate

Atlas won the round 2−1 on aggregate

Ranking of runners-up clubs

The best runner-up advances to the Championship Stage. If two or more teams are equal on points on completion of the group matches, the following criteria are applied to determine the rankings:

 superior goal difference;
 higher number of goals scored;
 higher number of goals scored away;
 best position in the Relegation table;
 fair play ranking;
 drawing of lots.

 Santos Laguna has a higher number of goals scored away in the group matches. (Santos Laguna 3, Pachuca 2)

Championship Stage

The eight clubs that advance to this stage will be ranked and seeded 1 to 8. In case of ties, the same tiebreakers used to rank the runners-up will be used.

In this stage, all the rounds will be one-off game. If the game ends in a tie, there will proceed to penalty shootouts directly.

The venue will be determined as follows:

The highest seeded club will host the match, regardless of the division the clubs are in.

Seeding
The qualified teams were seeded 1–8 in the championship stage according to their results in the group stage.

 Oaxaca has a higher number of goals scored away in the group matches. (Oaxaca 8, Monterrey 4)

Bracket
The bracket of the championship stage was determined by the seeding as follows:
Quarterfinals: Seed 1 vs. Seed 8 (QF1), Seed 2 vs. Seed 7 (QF2), Seed 3 vs. Seed 6 (QF3), Seed 4 vs. Seed 5 (QF4), with seeds 1–4 hosting the match
Semifinals: Winner QF1 vs. Winner QF3 (SF1), Winner QF2 vs. Winner QF4 (SF2), with the higher seed hosting the match
Finals: Winner SF1 vs. Winner SF2, with the highest seed hosting the match

Quarterfinals

Semifinals

Final

Top goalscorers

Source: LigaMX.net

References

External links
 Official page of Copa MX (as well as Liga MX and Ascenso MX)

2013, 2
Copa Mx, 2
Copa Mx, 2
Copa Mx, 2013